Neptuniibacter caesariensis is a Gram-negative, strictly aerobic, slightly halophilic and motile bacterium from the genus of Neptuniibacter which has been isolated from water from the Mediterranean Sea.

References

External links
Type strain of Neptuniibacter caesariensis at BacDive -  the Bacterial Diversity Metadatabase

Oceanospirillales
Bacteria described in 2007